Luchin is a surname. Notable people with the surname include:

Srdjan Luchin (born 1986), Romanian football player

See also
Luchins

Surnames